The 63rd Neste Oil Rally Finland was the eighth round of the 2013 World Rally Championship season and was held between 31 July and 3 August 2013. The rally is based in Jyväskylä.

The rally was also the eighth round of both WRC-2 and WRC-3 championships, and the third round of the JWRC championship.

Itinerary

The route of the rally features 23 stages with 324.21 kilometres of competitive distance.

Entry list

The entry list of the rally had overall 101 entries which was the biggest number in World Rally Championship since 2011 Rally Finland. 14 of the entries were World Rally Cars, 21 of them were competing in WRC-2, 11 in WRC-3 and 10 in Junior WRC.

On the Thursday morning a total of 96 cars started the rally. Entries withdrawn are marked with a grey background.

Results

References

External links
 Rally official website
 Rally Finland at WRC.com
 Rally Finland at eWRC.com
 Rally Finland at JUWRA.com

Finland
Rally Finland
Rally Finland